Kamala Todd is a filmmaker, community planner, and curator based in Vancouver, British Columbia. She is of Métis, Cree and European descent. Her writing, films, and curatorial practice often revolves around the topic of Indigineity in Canada.

Personal life and education 
Although she was born and raised in Vancouver, British Columbia, Todd’s family originates from both St. Paul, Alberta and Whitefish Lake, Alberta. Similarly to her mother, Loretta Todd, who was a prominent Indigenous filmmaker in Vancouver, she worked for the city while maintaining her career in film and video. Kamala Todd received her Bachelor of Arts in Geography in 1994, and completed her Master of Arts in Cultural Geography in 1999, both from the University of British Columbia.

Career 
From 2000-2006, Todd served as the Aboriginal Social Planner at the City of Vancouver. She has been working as an Indigenous advisor/facilitator for the past twenty years, working for various cultural organizations across Vancouver, and she currently works as the Indigenous Cultural Planner for the City of Vancouver. She has also taught at Langara College, Native Education Centre, and Simon Fraser University, teaching a wide range of topics from Aboriginal Community Development to Canadian and Media Studies.

Films/projects 
Some of her notable films include Indigenous Plant Diva (2008), Cedar and Bamboo, and Sharing our Stories: the Vancouver Dialogues Project. She has also curated for the Framing History Coast Salish artworks exhibit at the Roundhouse Community Centre, Indian Summer Festival, and the Drum is Calling Festival. Her video installation artwork, Known and Unknown Trails, which was produced at Kingcome Inlet to be a part of Marianne Nicholson and Althea Thauberger's exhibit, Hexsa’am: To be here Always at the Morris and Helen Belkin Art Gallery.

Awards, honours and residencies 

 Greater Vancouver Urban Aboriginal Award for Community Leadership, 2006. 
 Aboriginal Arts Development Award, First Peoples’ Heritage, Language and Culture Council, 2006 National Film Board of Canada Filmmakers Assistance grant, 2003
 Canada Council for the Arts, Aboriginal Media Arts production grant, 2000
 Aboriginal Achievement Foundation youth scholarship, for media training, 1999

References 

Living people
Canadian video artists
Women video artists
Canadian women film directors
Canadian art curators
Artists from Vancouver
Langara College people
Film directors from Vancouver
Year of birth missing (living people)
Canadian women curators